Ryan Patrick McMahon (born December 14, 1994) is an American professional baseball infielder for the Colorado Rockies of Major League Baseball (MLB).

Amateur career
McMahon attended Mater Dei High School in Santa Ana, California where he played baseball and football. The Rockies selected him in the second round, with the 42nd overall selection, of the 2013 Major League Baseball draft.

Professional career
McMahon signed with the Rockies, forgoing his commitment to play college baseball at the University of Southern California, and made his professional debut with the Grand Junction Rockies. He spent all of 2013 there, batting .321/.402/.583 with 11 home runs and 52 RBIs in 59 games. In 2014, he played for the Asheville Tourists where he posted a .282 batting average with 18 home runs, 102 RBIs, and 46 doubles in 126 games, and in 2015, he played with the Modesto Nuts where he slashed .300/.372/.520 with 18 home runs, 75 RBIs, and 43 doubles in 132 games. McMahon spent 2016 with the Hartford Yard Goats where he batted .242 with 12 home runs and 75 RBIs in 133 games.

McMahon began 2017 back with Hartford. Aside from third base, he also started to play second and first in order to improve his versatility. He was promoted to the Albuquerque Isotopes in June. He played in the All-Star Futures Game in July.

The Rockies promoted McMahon to the major leagues on August 11, 2017, primarily to play first base. He was sent back down on August 18 and recalled again in September. In 119 games between Hartford and Albuquerque he batted. 355/.403/.583 with 20 home runs and 88 RBIs, and in 17 games for Colorado, he batted .158.

The Rockies went into the 2018 season with McMahon as the primary first baseman, but after 28 games he was sent down to the Isotopes after beginning the season with just three RBIs and hitting .180 in 50 at-bats. On June 14, McMahon hit his first career home run. On August 11, with the Rockies trailing 0–2 to the Dodgers in the bottom of the 9th inning, McMahon hit a two-out three-run walk-off home run off Dodgers closer J. T. Chargois to give his team a 3–2 victory. It was McMahon's first career walk-off homerun and came only a day after he had hit another go-ahead home run against the Dodgers that proved to be the game winner.

In 2019, McMahon served as the Rockies' primary second baseman, playing other games at first base and third base. He batted .250/.329/.450, and had the highest strikeout percentage in the National League (29.7%). In the shortened 2020 season, McMahon hit .215/.295/.419 with 9 home runs and 26 RBIs in 52 games.

On April 6, 2021, in a game against the Arizona Diamondbacks, McMahon had his first career three home run game, with two solo shots off of starter Luke Weaver and one off of Alex Young. He finished the 2021 season slashing .254/.331/.449 with 23 home runs and a career-high 86 RBIs and 80 runs scored.

On March 21, 2022, McMahon signed a 6 year, $70 million contract extension with the Rockies. The extension will keep McMahon under contract until 2027 and allows for an opt-out after the fourth year if he finishes top five in National League MVP voting in any of the first three years.

References

External links

1994 births
Living people
Albuquerque Isotopes players
Asheville Tourists players
Baseball players from California
Colorado Rockies players
Grand Junction Rockies players
Hartford Yard Goats players
Major League Baseball first basemen
Major League Baseball second basemen
Major League Baseball third basemen
Modesto Nuts players
People from Yorba Linda, California
Salt River Rafters players